The Pitman's Courtship  is a famous Geordie folk song written in the 19th century by William Mitford, in a style deriving from music hall. This piece takes a humorous look at the courtship of a Pitman and his lass where the discussion forms the proposal of marriage and the couple's plans for a life together. This song was generally considered to be one of the region's finest 'traditional' songs, one of only a handful of Tyneside songs to be appreciated outside the region in its day.

Lyrics 

The earliest appearance of the song is in the budget chapbook "Newcastle Songster" series in 1816.

Melody 

"Traditional Air"

Comments on variations between different versions 

There are various published versions of the song, and probably due to the fact that many early versions were published on Chapbooks and consequently less care was taken in the details, spelling, etc., some seem to have difficulties in following the original Geordie dialect. Here are some of the variations:

"wor" is written in some versions as "wour" and "were"
"hor" is spelt variously as "her"
"Aw" is often written as "Aa'”
"fra" may be written "fFrae"
"Te" is often written as "To"
"awd" may be written "aud"
"mairridge" may be used as the spelling for "marridge,”
"thou" may be written "thou"
"Grandy" can be spelt "Granny"
"folk", "foke" and "foak"  are interchanged
Verse 1 line 5 may be completely different as "Unheeded I stole beside them"
Verse 7 line 5 may be different as "Aw think it's boot time we waur steppin',”
Verse 7 line 8 may be completely different as "These lovers they toddelt off hyem."

Recordings
"The Pitman's Courtship" from the CD "Graeme Danby sings stories from the North East" and "The Pitman's Courtship" from the CD "Come you not from Newcastle? – Newcastle songs volume 1" – which is one of 20 CD's in the boxed set Northumbria Anthology (Listen on ) – both from Mawson Wareham Music, MWM Records, 14 Cobblestone Court, Walker Rd Newcastle upon Tyne, NE6 1AB
Also
A sample to listen to by Graeme Danby –{Listen on )

See also
Geordie dialect words

References

English folk songs
Songs related to Newcastle upon Tyne
Northumbrian folklore
1820s songs